Michael J. McAlister is a special effects artist. He has been nominated on at least eleven occasions for special or visual effects awards and has won at least three of such awards: an Oscar, a BAFTA and an Emmy.

Awards 
 1985: won an Academy Award for Best Visual Effects for Indiana Jones and the Temple of Doom (film first released in 1984)
 1985: won a British Academy Film Award for Indiana Jones and the Temple of Doom (film first released in 1984)
 1986: won a Primetime Emmy Award for Outstanding Special Visual Effects for Ewoks: The Battle for Endor (TV movie first aired in 1985)

References

Year of birth missing (living people)
Best Visual Effects Academy Award winners
Best Visual Effects BAFTA Award winners
Special effects people
Living people
Emmy Award winners